Michał Budzyński (born 3 June 1988) is a Polish professional footballer who plays as a defender for Chełmianka Chełm.  He formerly played for Orlęta Radzyń Podlaski, Wisła Puławy, Motor Lublin, and Lewart Lubartów.

Career
Budzyński began his career at Legion Tomaszowice. After one-and-a-half seasons with Orion Niedrzwica Duża, he joined Koziołek Lublin, where he played until the end of the 2006–07 season. In the summer of 2007, Budzyński joined III liga side Orlęta Radzyń Podlaski. He made his debut for Orlęta in a 4–1 home defeat to Wisłoka Dębica. In the 2007–08 season Budzyński played 17 league matches.

In the autumn of 2008, he moved to I liga club Motor Lublin. After one season of reserve football at Motor, he made his professional debut on 8 August 2009 as a substitute in a 4–1 home loss to Warta Poznań.

On 24 February 2010, he joined III liga side Wisła Puławy. In his second season Budzyński made 24 league appearances for Wisła, scoring 3 goals, and helping them win promotion to II liga. On 11 July 2017, the club and player mutually agreed to terminate his contract. In his seven years in the Wisła first team, Budzyński made a total of 184 appearances in all competitions, scoring 13 goals.

On 12 July 2017, Budzyński signed for III liga club Motor Lublin. His contract at Motor was terminated by mutual consent on 30 April 2018. In August 2018, he signed a deal with Lewart Lubartów.

References

External links
 

1988 births
Living people
Polish footballers
Sportspeople from Lublin
Motor Lublin players
Wisła Puławy players
Chełmianka Chełm players
I liga players
II liga players
III liga players
IV liga players
Association football defenders
21st-century Polish people